Typhlodaphne corpulenta is a species of sea snail, a marine gastropod mollusk in the family Borsoniidae.

Description

Typhlodaphne corpulenta differs from Typhlodaphne innocentia Dell, 1990 by having a thicker shell.

Distribution
This species occurs in the Southern Indian Ocean off the Kerguelen Islands.

References

  Bouchet P., Kantor Yu.I., Sysoev A. & Puillandre N. (2011) A new operational classification of the Conoidea. Journal of Molluscan Studies 77: 273–308.

corpulenta
Gastropods described in 1881